Mater Hill busway station is located in Brisbane, Australia serving the suburb of South Brisbane. It opened on 23 October 2000 when the South East Busway opened from the Cultural Centre to Woolloongabba. It is surrounded by Mater Health Services, from which the station derives its name.

It is served by 36 routes operated by Brisbane Transport and Clarks Logan City Bus Service as part of the TransLink network.

The station has been notorious for bus build up due to shorter platforms. Stations like South Bank and Cultural Centre have space for 4 buses but Mater Hill can only hold 3.

References

External links
[ Mater Hill station] TransLink

Bus stations in Brisbane
South Brisbane, Queensland
Transport infrastructure completed in 2000